The Soco River is a river of the Dominican Republic.

See also
List of rivers of the Dominican Republic

References
 The Columbia Gazetteer of North America. 2000.

Rivers of the Dominican Republic